John Halliburton (1725–1808) was a surgeon and a Loyalist who settled in Nova Scotia.  He was a member of the North British Society.  He is the father of Chief Justice Brenton Halliburton and, in turn, the grandfather of John C. Halliburton (who fought a duel with Joseph Howe to protect his father's honour). He is buried in the Old Burying Ground (Halifax, Nova Scotia). Halliburton was elected a Fellow of the American Academy of Arts and Sciences in 1797. He was a close friend of Dr. Duncan Clark and shared the responsibility for the medical care of the Duke of Kent. He built his home the Bower, that still stands in Halifax.

References 

History of Nova Scotia
Fellows of the American Academy of Arts and Sciences
Loyalists who settled Nova Scotia
1725 births
1808 deaths
American Loyalists from Massachusetts